Rahim Beyglui, also rendered as Rahim Beyglu, may refer to:
 Rahim Beyglui-ye Olya
 Rahim Beyglui-ye Sofla